Skanifest was a punk, ska and rock festival organized in Ciney, Belgium from 2005 until 2009. The festival's aim was to host rock, ska and punk bands at fair prices. The Skanifest ASBL (non-profit organisation) was dissolved in 2010.

Each year, Skanifest tried to mix local groups starting out, more experienced local bands and artists with national, or even international, experience.

2005 Edition 
The first edition (15 April 2005) gathered around 400 people. This was the line-up:

 Wash Out Test(Be)
 Gino's Eyeball (Be)
 Mad Men's Team (Be)
 Fucking Peanuts (Be)
 BP Buckshot(Be)
 Bilo Band (Be)

2006 Edition 
The second edition (25 March 2006) was attended by around 1000 people. The line-up was:

 Vic Ruggiero (The Slackers, ex Rancid) (USA)
 The Moon Invaders (Be)
 PO Box (Fr)
 Skating Teenagers (Be)
 Mad Men's Team (Be)
 Shadocks (Be)
 BP Buckshot (Be)
 Bilo Band (Be)

2007 Edition 
The third edition took place in "Salle Cecoco", Ciney, Belgium on 27 January 2007.

This was the line up:

 Capdown (UK)
 Joshua (B)
 Sweek (B)
 Camping Sauvach' (B)
 Skafield (DE)
 PO Box (Fr)
 BP Buckshot (B)

2008 Edition 
On 5 April 2008.

 The Locos (ES)
 La Ruda (FR)
 The Experimental Tropic Blues Band (B)
 PO Box (Fr)
 Atomic Leaf (B)
 Elvis Black Stars (B)

2009 Edition 
The fifth edition took place in "Ciney Expo", Ciney, Belgium on 6 February 2009.

This was the line up:

 Joshua (B)
 Reel Big Fish (USA)
 Malibu Stacy (B)
 Camping Sauvach (B)
 Suburban Legends (USA)
 Sinus Georges (B)
 Les Caricoles (B)

External links
Site de Skanifest
Photos de l'édition 2008

Music festivals in Belgium
Ska festivals
Punk rock festivals
Rock festivals in Belgium
Ciney